The Jinbei Haise X30L (海狮X30L) is a 7-seater microvan produced by Chinese car manufacturer Brilliance Auto under the Jinbei marque.

Overview
Based on the same platform as the Jinbei Haixing X30, the Jinbei Haise X30L was released by Brilliance Auto in December, 2015. 

Built by Brilliance Xinyuan Chongqing Auto (华晨鑫源), the Chongqing branch of Brilliance Auto, the Jinbei Haise X30L was offered with engine options including a 1.3 liter DLCG12 inline-four petrol engine, a 1.5 liter SWC15M inline-four petrol engine, and a 1.5 liter DLCG14 inline-four petrol engine, with all engines paired with a 5-speed manual transmission. Prices of the Jinbei X30 ranges from 35,000 yuan to 46,800 yuan.

Jinbei Haise S
The Jinbei Haise S is the facelifted version of the Jinbei Haise X30L. The Haise S features a restyled front end, replacing the BMW-inspired kidney grilles from the X30L. Engine options include a 1.5 liter engine and 1.6 liter engine with both engines mated to a 5-speed manual gearbox. Prices of the Jinbei Haise S range from 50,800 yuan to 56,800 yuan.

Pickup variants
The Haise X30L also spawned several pickup versions with the 2-door model called the Jinbei T30, and the 4-door crew cab called the Jinbei T32. Heavy duty pickup versions with dually are also available with the 2-door model called the Jinbei T50, and the 4-door crew cab called the Jinbei T52. The more upmarket Jinbei Haise S spawned the Jinbei S30 2-door pickup and the 4-door Jinbei S32 crew cab. The Jinbei S30 2-door pickup was relaunched as the Jinbei Jinka S2 as of February 2023.

SRM Shineray X30L/ SRM Shineray Haixing X30L EV/ SRM Shineray X30LEV/ SRM Shineray Haoyun No.1/ Hangtianshenzhou Automobiles DST Shenzhou No.5
The SRM Shineray X30L is a rebadged version of the Jinbei Haise X30L wearing the SRM Shineray badge of Brilliance Xinyuan Chongqing Auto. The SRM Shineray X30LEV is the electric variant, while the SRM Shineray Haoyun No.1 is the electric panel van variant. The SRM Shineray X30LEV features a 49.1kWh battery and the electric range is 305km. The SRM Shineray Haoyun No.1 panel van features a 49.1kWh battery and the electric range is 285km.

The DST Shenzhou No.5 (DST神州5号) by Hangtianshenzhou Automobiles (航天神州汽车) is another rebadge based on the SRM Shineray Haoyun No.1 with the model still wearing the SRM Shineray logo. The DST Shenzhou No.5 is powered by a rear-positioned electric motor producing 80hp and 220 N·m powering the rear wheels. The DST Shenzhou No.5 features a 41.86kWh battery and the electric range is 300km.

Dongfeng EM13 Electric panel van
The Dongfeng EM13 is a rebadged electric panel van sharing the same platforms of the Jinbei Haise X30L, produced since 2018. Dimensions are exactly the same as the Jinbei Haixing X30L with product model names DFA5030XXYABEV and DFA5030XXYABEV1. Payload of the Dongfeng EM13 DFA5030XXYABEV is 1440kg with a capacity of 2 occupants. Payload of the Dongfeng EM13 DFA5030XXYABEVa is 860kg with a capacity of 2+.3 occupants. Both models of the Dongfeng EM13 utilize the permanent magnet synchronization motors with motor parameters 40/75kw and 72/165Nm. Driving range can exceed 220km.

Farizon E5L Electric panel van
The Farizon E5L is a rebadged electric panel van by Geely under the Farizon brand sharing the X30L platform. The smaller Farizon E5 models are Gonow Way CL- based while the Farizon E5L models are rebadged Haise X30Ls. As of 2020, only the E5L remains to be available. The E5L features sliding side doors. 

The E5L is powered by a rear positioned 60kW motor developing 82Ps and 220Nm powering the rear wheels. The top speed is 90km/hr, and the battery is available as a 39.9kWh battery by Guoxuan and a 41.86kWh battery by CATL with both batteries capable of a range of 280km.

Ankai T3 and Ankai Kuaileyun
The Ankai T3 and Ankai Kuaileyun (安凯快乐运) are rebadged electric panel van variants based on the Haise X30L by Ankai. The maximum power output of the Ankai Kuaileyun is 60kW with a maximum torque of 220N·m. Batteries are supplied by CATL and the maximum range on a full charge is 290km.

Esemka Bima EV
The Indonesian maufacturer, Esemka, rebadged the Jinbei Haise X30L and sold as the Bima EV and the Jinbei T30 as the Bima 1.3 pickup. It debuted on the 2023 Indonesia International Motor Show.

References

External links
Jinbei official site

Vans
Microvans
Rear-wheel-drive vehicles
Haise X30L
Cars introduced in 2015